F80 may refer to:

Vehicles 
Aircraft
 Farman F.80, a French biplane
 Lockheed F-80 Shooting Star, an American jet fighter
 UL-Jih F80 Fascination, a Czech ultralight

Automobiles
 BMW F80, a German high performance sedan
 Toyota Kijang (F80), a Japanese multi purpose vehicle

Ships
 , a Blackwood-class frigate of the Royal Navy
  a Type 23 frigate of the Royal Navy
 , an R-class destroyer of the Royal Navy
 , a destroyer tender of the Royal Navy

Other uses 
 Nikon F80, a SLR camera also known as the Nikon N80